List of subcamps of the Kraków-Płaszów complex of Nazi concentration camps located mostly in the vicinity of Kraków in the semi-colonial district of General Government in occupied Poland between 19421944.

Kraków Płaszów (Julag I)
Kraków Prokocim (Julag II)
Kraków Bieżanow (Julag III)
 so-called Kabel camp
established in March 1943 at the former "Kabel" plant in Kraków, at 75 Prokocimska street.
Kraków Zabłocie DEF, Oskar Schindler's "Deutsche Emaillewarenfabrik", former "Rekord" plant, at 4 Lipowa street in central Kraków, with 1,200 slave workers.
Kraków Zabłocie NKF

Kraków Zabłocie Feldpunkt 
Kraków Rakowice near the airpor
Mielec in former Polish airplane factory, set up for Heinkel (Luftwaffe) in 1939, with 2,000 slave workers including 300 (preyed upon) kitchen and maintenance women.
Wieliczka (1944), underground airplane parts factory located at the site of the Wieliczka Salt Mine with 1,700 slave workers.
Zakopane (1942–1943), stone quarry "Stuag" with 1,000 slave workers.

See also
List of Nazi-German concentration camps

Notes and references

 
Kraków-Płaszów
Krakow
Poland history-related lists